Labeobarbus habereri is a species of Cyprinid fish endemic to Cameroon in Africa.

References 

Fish described in 1912
Taxa named by Franz Steindachner
Cyprinid fish of Africa
Endemic fauna of Cameroon
habereri